Jerk is a British black comedy television series starring and co-written by Tim Renkow. It centres around Tim (played by Renkow), a man with cerebral palsy who tries to use his condition to his advantage. The character of Tim is based upon Renkow, who also has cerebral palsy. The series built upon a 2016 BBC production, A Brief History of Tim.

Jerk first aired on 24 February 2019 on BBC Three. In September 2019, it was reported that BBC Three had ordered a second series before the first had aired. The second series premiered on BBC Three on 1 August 2021. The show was renewed for a third series in 2022.

Plot
Tim (Tim Renkow) has cerebral palsy, and is also a terrible person. He attempts to take maximum advantage of his condition by being insufferable to those around him. In Season 1, Tim faces deportation due to the impending expiration of his visa, and makes various attempts to ward off this fate.

Cast

Series 1

 Tim Renkow as Tim 
 Sharon Rooney as  Ruth, Tim's care-worker
 Rob Madin as Idris, Tim's friend and employment consultant
 Lorraine Bracco as Tim's mother
 Karl Theobald as Shaun
 Lee Ridley as Kiefer 
 David Calder as Great Uncle Thomas

Episodes

Series Overview

Series 1 (2019)

Series 2 (2021)

Series 3 (2023)

Reception 
Reviewing the first series of the show in Guardian, Stuart Jeffries describes Renkow as "Larry David with a twist". In The Times, Carol Midgley gave the second series of the show a positive review, comparing it favourably to Curb Your Enthusiasm: "[..] both series push the boundaries splendidly into dark, dark humour and political incorrectness and both have selfish, thrillingly unlikeable lead characters."

References

External links

2019 British television series debuts
2010s British black comedy television series
2010s British sitcoms
2020s British black comedy television series
2020s British sitcoms
Television shows set in England